Piriyilla Naam is a 1984 Indian Malayalam-language film, directed and produced by Joshiy. The film stars Prem Nazir and Shankar, supported by Jose, Jose Prakash and Krishnachandran. The film's score was composed by K. V. Mahadevan.

Cast

Shankar
Prem Nazir
Jose
Jose Prakash
Krishnachandran
Lakshmi
Rohini
Cochin Haneefa
Menaka
Prathapachandran
K. P. A. C. Azeez
Bahadoor
Balan K. Nair
KPAC Sunny
Sreenath
Sumithra

Soundtrack
The music was composed by K. V. Mahadevan with lyrics by Poovachal Khader.

References

External links
 

1984 films
1980s Malayalam-language films
Films scored by K. V. Mahadevan
Films directed by Joshiy